is a Japanese high jumper. He competed at the 2015 World Championships in Beijing without qualifying for the final.
 
His personal bests in the event are 2.32 metres outdoors (Lignano Sabbiadoro 2018) and 2.35 metres indoors (Karlsruhe 2019).

Tobe received a PhD degree in Sport science from the University of Tsukuba in 2019.

Competition record

References

Living people
1992 births
People from Noda, Chiba
Sportspeople from Chiba Prefecture
Japanese male high jumpers
Asian Games bronze medalists for Japan
Asian Games medalists in athletics (track and field)
Athletes (track and field) at the 2014 Asian Games
Athletes (track and field) at the 2018 Asian Games
Medalists at the 2018 Asian Games
Competitors at the 2011 Summer Universiade
Competitors at the 2013 Summer Universiade
World Athletics Championships athletes for Japan
Japan Championships in Athletics winners
Athletes (track and field) at the 2020 Summer Olympics
Olympic athletes of Japan